This is a list of the aircraft of the Spanish Air Force during World War II. The main role of the Spanish airforce during World War II was to keep Spanish neutrality as can be seen when Spanish aircraft tried to keep allied aircraft out of the Spanish protectorate in Morocco during Operation Torch. This list does not show the aircraft of the Spanish volunteer Blue Squadron as they were part of the Luftwaffe in that role not the Spanish Air Force despite being Spanish pilots.

Fighters 

 Polikarpov I-15
 Polikarpov I-16
 Heinkel He 51
 Heinkel He 112
 Arado Ar 68
 Messerschmitt Bf 109
 Fiat G.50 Freccia
 Fiat CR.32

Ground attack and dive bombers 

 Henschel Hs 123
 Breda Ba.65

Bombers 

 Heinkel He 111
 Junkers Ju 86
 Junkers Ju 88
 Dornier Do 17
Savoia-Marchetti SM.79 Sparviero
Savoia-Marchetti SM.81 Pipistrello
 Fiat BR.20 Cicogna
 Caproni Ca.310
North American B-25 Mitchell-One confiscated aircraft

Maritime aircraft 

 Dornier Do 24
 Focke-Wulf Fw 200 Condor
 CANT Z.501 Gabbiano
 CANT Z.506 Airone
 Fairey Swordfish-Confiscated

Trainers 

 Bücker Bü 131 Jungmann
 Bücker Bü 133 Jungmeister
 Gotha Go 145
 De Havilland Tiger Moth

References

World War II, list
Spain